The Houston Heights Woman's Club was organized in 1900 to support any literary and scientific undertaking; the maintenance of a library; and the promotion of painting, music and other fine arts.  When founding members of the Club adopted a Constitution and By-Laws in 1905, they included to "aid and encourage charitable and educational interests of Houston Heights" as an important part of the Club's purpose.

The original group, now known as the Houston Heights Woman's Club-Heritage Group, is still strong after 100 years.  Generations of these friendly and community-oriented women have contributed to the history of the Heights and greater Houston since 1900, and served in the forefront of Women's issues since.  They gather regularly for meetings and potluck luncheons, and enjoy various other activities throughout the year including community service projects, charitable fundraisers, outings, and social events.

In 2007 the Houston Heights Woman's Club-Evening Group was founded.

History 

The Houston Heights Woman's Club (HHWC) is a registered 501(c)(3) nonprofit organization established to preserve the historical integrity of the Club and its clubhouse, and provide social and charitable opportunities for its members.

The Houston Heights Woman's Club was founded in 1900, part of the larger women's club movement across the country.  What began as the Houston Heights Literary Club soon outgrew the parlors of its members.  In 1912, the Clubhouse at 1846 Harvard became the official home of the Houston Heights Woman's Club.  This Club would become part of the very fabric of the Heights neighborhood.  Through volunteerism and social activities, generations of members have kept the legacy of the HHWC alive.

Club Collect 
By Mary Stewart, 1904*

Keep us O God from pettiness;
Let us be large in thought, in word and in deed.
Let us be done with fault finding
And leave off self-seeking.
May we put away all pretenses and meet each face
To face, without self-pity and without prejudice.
May we never be hasty in judgment
And always be generous.
Let us take time for all things;
Teach us to put into action our better impulses,
Straightforward and unafraid.
Grant that we may realize that it is the little things that
Create differences,
That in the big things of life we are as one.
And, may we strive to touch and to know the great,
Common woman's heart of us all,
And, O Lord God, let us not forget to be kind.

 Written in 1904 by Mary Stewart, then a school principal.  Mary said of her poem, "It was written as a prayer for the day.  I called a 'Collect For Club Women' because I felt that women working together with wide interests for large ends was a new thing under the sun, and that perhaps they had a need for special petition and mediation of their own."  Like many women's organizations across the country, we believe so strongly in Mary's message that we recite her poem at the start of every meeting.

Membership 
The annual fee for being a member of the club is one-hundred dollars in cash/check or online payment for one-hundred and three dollars. There is no requirement to be a woman or a member of the Heights community, but the majority of the members are female and live in the Heights community and many events and activities are aimed towards women of the community.

Achievements

See also
 National Register of Historic Places listings in Harris County, Texas

References

Women's club buildings in Texas
1900 establishments in Texas
Clubhouses on the National Register of Historic Places in Texas
National Register of Historic Places in Houston
Recorded Texas Historic Landmarks
Women's clubs in the United States
History of women in Texas